Sandra Collins is an American DJ, record producer, and remixer.

Biography
Collins got her start on the West Coast of the U.S. in Phoenix, Arizona and then moved into residencies in Los Angeles, and eventually moved towards trance. She used American producers to give herself a unique sound. Collins performed for an estimated 80,000 people on the first night of Woodstock '99, and was the first female DJ featured in the influential Tranceport recording series. She has released two CD mixes under Paul Oakenfold's Perfecto label.

Collins was the focus of a 2013 documentary, Girl, highlighting female DJs in EDM subculture.

Discography

See also
 List of HFStival acts

References

External links

Year of birth missing (living people)
American DJs
Record producers from Nevada
American trance musicians
Club DJs
Women DJs
Living people
Musicians from Las Vegas
Remixers
Electronic dance music DJs
American women record producers
American women in electronic music
21st-century American women